The Clementi Stadium is a multi-purpose stadium in Clementi, Singapore. It has a seating capacity of 4,000.

It is managed by the Sport Singapore, which took over on 21 February 1983, and opened it to the public on 1 April the same year.

It formerly served as the home ground for Tanjong Pagar United FC, Home United FC and Tampines Rovers FC.

Rallies prior to the 2011 Singaporean general election by the Reform Party were held here.

External links
 Frank Jasperneite page

Football venues in Singapore
Rugby union stadiums in Singapore
Clementi
Multi-purpose stadiums in Singapore
Singapore Premier League venues
Tanjong Pagar United FC
Lion City Sailors FC
Tampines Rovers FC